Microcrambus castrella is a moth in the family Crambidae. It was described by Schaus in 1922. It is found in Brazil.

References

Crambini
Moths described in 1922
Moths of South America